Y94 may refer to:

 KOYY, a radio station (93.7) in Fargo, North Dakota
 WYYY, a radio station (94.5) in Syracuse, New York
 Yttrium-94 (Y-94 or 94Y), an isotope of yttrium